(1320 – 1380) was a Japanese court noble, and an important supporter of the Southern Court during the Nanboku-chō Wars. His father was imperial advisor Kitabatake Chikafusa. His daughter became empress of Emperor Go-Kameyama.

His kami is enshrined at Ryōzen Shrine in Date, Fukushima Fukushima Prefecture, which is one of the Fifteen Shrines of the Kenmu Restoration.

References

External links
Japanese biographical account

1320 births
1380 deaths
Minamoto clan
Kuge
Deified Japanese people